"The Loving Kind" is a song by Girls Aloud

The Loving Kind may also refer to:

 The Loving Kind (Cindy Morgan album), 1998
 The Loving Kind (Nanci Griffith album), 2009